Carlos José Solórzano Gutiérrez (17 January 1860 in Managua – 30 August 1936 in San José, Costa Rica) was the President of Nicaragua between 1 January 1925 and 14 March 1926.

History
He headed a political coalition which was moderate Conservative which led to his rise as the Conservative Party received United States assistance in attaining power. But when the detachment of U.S. Marines which had remained in Nicaragua for thirteen years withdrew, it led to his downfall. In October 1925, the government of Solórzano was overthrown in a coup by former President General Emiliano Chamorro, who failed to gain U.S. recognition and subsequently resigned in favor of Adolfo Díaz.

Biography
He was the son of Federico Solórzano Reyes and wife Rosa Gutiérrez ... and paternal grandson of Ramón Solórzano Montealegre and wife Juana Reyes Robira, who by his second wife Mónica Cardoze ... was the father of Enrique Solórzano Cardoze, married to Luz Vasconcelos ..., both of Portuguese descent, and had Marina Solórzano Vasconcelos, married to Fernando Abaunza Cuadra, whose daughter Esmeralda Abaunza Solórzano married her first cousin Alejandro Abaunza Espinoza, son of Carlos Abaunza Cuadra and wife Dolores Espinoza ... and had Lila T. Abaunza, First Lady of Nicaragua, married to Enrique Bolaños, 82nd President of Nicaragua.

He was married to his cousin Leonor Rivas Solórzano, without issue.

He was a relative of Fernando Guzmán, 37th President of Nicaragua.

He was the brother of Rosa Solorzano.   Rosa Solorzano was the mother Lisimaco Lacayo Solorzano.  Lisimaco Lacayo Solorzano  was married to Berta Lacayo Sacasa, and they had two children Chester Lacayo Lacayo and Will Lacayo Lacayo.  Will Lacayo Lacayo had four children  Danilo Lacayo, Berta Lacayo, Ligia Lacayo and Tania Lacayo.

References

1860 births
1936 deaths
People from Managua
Presidents of Nicaragua
People of the Banana Wars
Conservative Party (Nicaragua) politicians